is a broad pyroclastic plateau in southern Japan. It covers almost all of southern Kyūshū, which was formed by pyroclastic flows. It covers more than half of Kagoshima Prefecture, as well as 16% of Miyazaki Prefecture. The Japanese Shirasu (シラス) is a local name of the pumiceous sediments in Kagoshima Prefecture, Japan. The term has been recommended to be used just for the non-welded ignimbrite component in the Japanese geological literature.  Daichi (台地) means plateau.

Geology
A major three phase eruption of the Aira Caldera formed in the first phase the Osumi pumice fall, had a second phase Tsumaya pyroclastic flow and in the third Ito eruption phase produced the  widely distributed  Aira-Tn tephra that has been dated at 29,428 to 30,148 years calibrated before present. However an eruption about 11,000 years before present did result in the Satsuma pumice fall and there have been multiple relatively minor ash falls since from the local active volcanoes.

References

Volcanic plateaus
Pyroclastic plateaus
Volcanoes of Kyushu
Landforms of Miyazaki Prefecture
Landforms of Kagoshima Prefecture